St Philip's Marsh is an industrial inner suburb of Bristol, England.  It is bounded by River Avon and Harbour feeder canal making it an almost island area, unlike the other two areas surrounded by water, it was historically part of Gloucestershire and is part of North Bristol.  The site is  home of Avonmeads Retail Park, a large retail and leisure park with Showcase Cinemas and a Hollywood Bowl ten-pin bowling centre among its tenants.  It was extensively redeveloped in the 15 years to 2007.  A bypass runs over the River Avon creating a major transport link from the A4 road in south east Bristol, to junction 3 of the M32 motorway near the city centre.
In past years St Philip's marsh was a housing development for the workers of Bristol's market area (now known as Old Market).  One of St Philip's' more influential residents during the early 1900s was George Townsend, a major property developer of the South Bristol area.  His family home situated in the St Anne's area of Bristol is still standing today and a reminder of Bristol's history. Today there is very little housing in the area making it almost deserted at night, and other than the retail area it does contain one shop, pub, takeaway and Sparke Evans Park.
St Davids Welsh Anglican  Church was sited on Feeder road until demolition in 1922. Other churches in the area include St Silas (also Feeder Road) which was damaged during the Bristol Blitz.

Geology
The solid geology of St Philip's Marsh comprises Triassic Redcliffe Sandstone in the east, and Triassic mudstone and halite-stone of the Mercia Mudstone Group to the west. The solid geology is overlain by Quaternary Tidal Flat Deposits of silt and clay, which are in turn covered by deep deposits of made ground.

Sparke Evans Park
Sparke Evans Park is situated on the riverside not far from the retail park. The land was donated by P.F. Sparke Evans and Jonathan Evans, local tannery owners, in 1902. It is a survivor from a time when the Marsh was a residential area. Since the area has become almost totally industrial it now gets little use, what use it does get is by workers on breaks and from the residents of Arno's Vale and Totterdown as there is a bridge linking the two areas. A shelter dating from 1925 is still extant on the far west of the park featuring wrought-iron pillars, with ornate and decorative brackets.

Railways

St Philip's Marsh is located close to Bristol Temple Meads railway station, on the Great Western Main Line. St Philip's Marsh depot is a train maintenance depot located within the district.

Originally developed by the Great Western Railway as a twin-turntable facility for freight locomotives, it was closed to steam in June 1964 and redeveloped as a diesel depot. Owned by Network Rail under depot code PM, it is leased to train operator Great Western Railway, and has been used since their introduction for the maintenance of InterCity 125 trains operating between London Paddington, Bristol and South Wales. Both Class 43 power cars and Mark 3 coaching stock are serviced here.

Following the merger of First Great Western (FGW) and Wessex Trains operations into one new franchise in 2006, St Philip's Marsh took over the maintenance of FGW's fleet of diesel multiple units, previously maintained at Cardiff Canton TMD by Arriva Trains Wales. The move allowed the removal of the need for the majority of trains operating area, mostly in the West Country, requiring to travel through the congested Severn Tunnel.

References

External links 
 Map of St Philip's Marsh circa 1900
 An overhead view of St Philip's Marsh T&RSMD.

Areas of Bristol